1988 was a crucial year in the early history of the Internet—it was the year of the first well-known computer virus, the 1988 Internet worm. The first permanent intercontinental Internet link was made between the United States (NSFNET) and Europe (Nordunet) as well as the first Internet-based chat protocol, Internet Relay Chat. The concept of the World Wide Web was first discussed at CERN in 1988.

The Soviet Union began its major deconstructing towards a mixed economy at the beginning of 1988 and began its gradual dissolution. The Iron Curtain began to disintegrate in 1988 as Hungary began allowing freer travel to the Western world. The first extrasolar planet, Gamma Cephei Ab (confirmed in 2002) was detected this year and the World Health Organization began its mission to eradicate polio.

Events

January
 January – The cargo ship Khian Sea deposits 4,000 tons of toxic waste in Haiti after wandering around the Atlantic for sixteen months.
 January 1 – The Soviet Union begins its program of economic restructuring (perestroika) with legislation initiated by Premier Mikhail Gorbachev (though Gorbachev had begun minor restructuring in 1985).
 January 7–8 – In the Afghan War, 39 men of the Soviet Airborne Troops from the 345th Independent Guards Airborne Regiment fight off an attack by 200 to 250 Mujahideen in the Battle for Hill 3234, later dramatized in the Russian film The 9th Company.
 January 13 – Vice-president Lee Teng-hui takes over as President of the Republic of China and Chairman of the Kuomintang following the death of Chiang Ching-kuo.

February
 February 12 – The 1988 Black Sea bumping incident: Soviet frigate Bezzavetnyy intentionally rams USS Yorktown in Soviet territorial waters while Yorktown claims innocent passage. The accompanying US destroyer  escapes damage. 
 February 13–28 – The 1988 Winter Olympics are held in Calgary, Alberta, Canada.
 February 17
 1988 Oshakati bomb blast: A bomb explodes outside the First National Bank in Oshakati, Namibia, killing 27 and injuring 70.
 U.S. Lieutenant Colonel William R. Higgins, serving with a United Nations group monitoring a truce in southern Lebanon, is kidnapped (and later killed by his captors).
 February 20 – The Nagorno-Karabakh Autonomous Oblast votes to secede from the Azerbaijan Soviet Socialist Republic and join the Armenian SSR, triggering the First Nagorno-Karabakh War.
 February 23 – Start of Anfal campaign, a genocidal counterinsurgency operation within the Iran–Iraq War carried out by Ba'athist Iraqi forces led by Ali Hassan al-Majid on the orders of President Saddam Hussein that will kill between 50,000 and 182,000 Kurds in Iraqi Kurdistan.
 February 25 – The constitution of the Sixth Republic of Korea comes into effect.
 February 27–29 – Collapse of the Soviet Union: The Sumgait pogrom of Armenians occurs in Sumqayit.
 February 29 – A Nazi document implicates Kurt Waldheim in World War II deportations.

March
 March 6 – Operation Flavius: A Special Air Service team of the British Army shoots dead 3 unarmed members of a Provisional Irish Republican Army (IRA) Active service unit in Gibraltar.
 March 16
 The Halabja chemical attack is carried out by Iraqi government forces.
 Iran–Contra affair: Lieutenant Colonel Oliver North and Vice Admiral John Poindexter are indicted on charges of conspiracy to defraud the United States. 
 Milltown Cemetery attack: Three men are killed and 70 wounded in a gun and grenade attack by loyalist paramilitary Michael Stone on mourners at Milltown Cemetery in Belfast, Northern Ireland, during the funerals of the 3 IRA members killed in Gibraltar.
 In the United States, the First Republic Bank of Texas fails and enters FDIC receivership, the largest FDIC assisted bank failure in history.
 March 17
 A Colombian Boeing 727 jetliner, Avianca Flight 410, crashes into the side of the mountains near the Venezuelan border, killing 143 people.
 Eritrean War of Independence – Battle of Afabet: The Nadew Command, an Ethiopian army corps in Eritrea, is attacked on 3 sides by military units of the Eritrean People's Liberation Front (EPLF).
 March 19 – Corporals killings in Belfast: Two British Army corporals are abducted, beaten and shot dead by Irish republicans after driving into the funeral cortege of IRA members killed in the Milltown Cemetery attack.
 March 20 – Eritrean War of Independence: Having defeated the Nadew Command, the EPLF enters the town of Afabet, victoriously concluding the Battle of Afabet.
 March 24 – The first McDonald's restaurant in a country run by a Communist party opens in Belgrade, Yugoslavia. In 1989 it will be followed by one in Budapest, and in 1990 in Moscow and Shenzhen, China.
 March 25 – The Candle demonstration in Bratislava, Slovakia, is the first mass demonstration of the 1980s against the socialist government in Czechoslovakia.

April

 April 5 – Kuwait Airways Flight 422 is hijacked while en route from Bangkok, Thailand, to Kuwait. The hijackers demand the release of 17 Shiite Muslim prisoners held by Kuwait. Kuwait refuses to release the prisoners, leading to a 16-day siege across 3 continents. Two passengers are killed before the siege ends.
 April 10 – The Ojhri Camp Disaster occurs in Islamabad and Rawalpindi.
 April 14
 In the Geneva Accords, the Soviet Union commits itself to withdrawal of its forces from Afghanistan.
 The USS Samuel B. Roberts (FFG-58) strikes a naval mine in the Persian Gulf, while deployed on Operation Earnest Will, during the Tanker War phase of the Iran–Iraq War.
 April 16 – Israeli commandos kill the PLO's Abu Jihad in Tunisia.
 April 18 – The United States Navy retaliates for the  mining with Operation Praying Mantis, in a day of strikes against Iranian oil platforms and naval vessels.
 April 20 – The world's longest skyjacking comes to an end when the remaining passengers of Kuwait Airways Flight 422 are released by their captors.
 April 28 – Aloha Airlines Flight 243 safely lands after losing its roof in midair, killing a flight attendant and injuring 65 people.
 April 30 – World Expo 88 opens in Brisbane, Queensland, Australia.

May
 May 8 – Re-election of François Mitterrand as President of France for 7 years.
 May 15 – Soviet–Afghan War: After more than 8 years of fighting, the Soviet Army begins its withdrawal from Afghanistan.
 May 16–18 – 1988 Gilgit massacre: A revolt by the Shias of Gilgit (in northern Pakistan) is ruthlessly suppressed by the Zia-ul Haq regime.
 May 27–29 – Somaliland War of Independence: Somali National Movement launches a major offensive against Somali government forces in Hargeisa and Burao, then second and third largest cities of Somalia.

June
 June 10–14 – Spontaneous 100,000 strong mass night-singing demonstrations in Estonian SSR eventually give name to the Singing Revolution.
 June 10–25 – West Germany hosts the UEFA Euro 1988 football tournament, which is won by the Netherlands.
 June 23 – NASA scientist James Hansen testifies to the U.S. Senate that man-made global warming has begun, becoming one of the first environmentalists to warn of the problem.
 June 27 
 The Gare de Lyon rail accident occurs in Paris, France as a commuter train headed inbound to the terminal crashes into a stationary outbound train, killing 56 and injuring 57.
Villa Tunari massacre: Bolivian anti-narcotics police kills 9 to 12 and injuries over a hundred protesting coca-growing peasants.
 June 30 – Roman Catholic Archbishop Marcel Lefebvre consecrates four bishops at Écône, Switzerland, for his apostolate, along with Bishop Antonio de Castro Mayer, without a papal mandate.

July
 July 1 – The Soviet Union votes to end the CPSU's monopoly on economic and other non-political power and to further economic changes towards a less rigidly Marxist-Leninist economy.
 July 3
 The Fatih Sultan Mehmet Bridge in Istanbul, Turkey, is completed, providing the second connection between the continents of Europe and Asia over the Bosphorus.
 July 6 – The Piper Alpha production platform in the North Sea is destroyed by explosions and fires, killing 165 oil workers and 2 rescue mariners. 61 workers survive.
 July 31 – Thirty-two people are killed and 1,674 injured when a bridge at the Sultan Abdul Halim Ferry terminal collapses in Butterworth, Penang, Malaysia.

August
 August 5 – The 1988 Malaysian constitutional crisis culminates in the ousting of the Lord President of Malaysia, Salleh Abas.
 August 8 – 8888 Uprising: Thousands of protesters in Burma, now known as Myanmar, are killed during anti-government demonstrations.
 August 11 – A meeting of Islamic Jihadi leaders, including Osama bin Laden, takes place, leading to the founding of Al-Qaeda.
 August 17 – Pakistani President Muhammad Zia-ul-Haq and the U.S. ambassador to Pakistan, Arnold Lewis Raphel, are among those killed when a plane crashes and explodes near Bahawalpur.
 August 20 – A ceasefire effectively ends the Iran–Iraq War, with an estimated one million lives lost.
 August 21 – The  6.9 Nepal earthquake shakes the Nepal–India border with a maximum Mercalli intensity of VIII (Severe), leaving 709–1,450 people killed and thousands injured.
 August 28 – Seventy people are killed and 346 injured in one of the worst air show disasters in history at Germany's Ramstein Air Base, when three jets from the Italian air demonstration team, Frecce Tricolori, collide, sending one of the aircraft crashing into the crowd of spectators.

September
 September 11 – Singing Revolution: In the Estonian Soviet Socialist Republic, 300,000 people gather to express their support for independence.
 September 12 – Hurricane Gilbert devastates Jamaica; it turns towards Mexico's Yucatán Peninsula 2 days later, causing an estimated $5 billion in damage.
 September 15 – The International Olympic Committee awards Lillehammer the right to host the 1994 Winter Olympics.
 September 17–October 2 – The 1988 Summer Olympics are held in Seoul, South Korea.
 September 22 – The Ocean Odyssey drilling rig suffers a blowout and fire in the North Sea (see also July 6), resulting in one death.
 September 29 – STS-26: NASA resumes Space Shuttle flights, grounded after the Challenger disaster, with Space Shuttle Discovery.

October
 October 5
 Thousands riot in Algiers, Algeria against the National Liberation Front government; by October 10 the army has tortured and killed about 500 people in crushing the riots.
 Chilean dictator Augusto Pinochet loses a national plebiscite on his rule; he relinquishes power in 1990.
 Promulgation of the 1988 Constitution of the Federative Republic of Brazil.
 October 12
 Walsh Street police shootings: Two Victoria Police officers are gunned down, execution style, in Australia.
 The Birchandra Manu massacre occurs in Tripura, India.
 October 20 – The Los Angeles Dodgers won 4 games to 1 in the 1988 World Series against the Oakland Athletics.
 October 27 – Ronald Reagan decides to tear down the new U.S. Embassy in Moscow because of Soviet listening devices in the building structure.
 October 28 – Abortion: 48 hours after announcing it was abandoning RU-486, French manufacturer Roussel Uclaf states that it will resume distribution of the drug.
 October 29 – Pakistan's General Rahimuddin Khan resigns from his post as the governor of Sindh, following attempts by the President of Pakistan, Ghulam Ishaq Khan, to limit the powers Rahimuddin had accumulated.
 October 30 – Jericho bus firebombing: Five Israelis are killed and five wounded in a Palestinian attack in the West Bank.

November
 November – TAT-8, the first transatlantic telephone cable to use optical fibers, is completed. This led to more robust connections between the American and European Internet.
 November 2 – The Morris worm, the first computer worm distributed via the Internet, written by Robert Tappan Morris, is launched from Massachusetts Institute of Technology in the U.S.
 November 3 – Sri Lankan Tamil mercenaries try to overthrow the Maldivian government. At President Maumoon Abdul Gayoom's request, the Indian military suppresses the coup attempt within 24 hours.
 November 6 – The 1988 Lancang–Gengma earthquakes kills at least 938 people when it strikes the China–Myanmar border region in Yunnan.
 November 8 – The United States Vice-president and Republican nominee George H. W. Bush, defeats the Democratic nominee and Governor of Massachusetts, Michael Dukakis, in the 1988 United States Presidential Election.
 November 15
 In the Soviet Union, the unmanned Shuttle Buran is launched by an Energia rocket on its maiden orbital spaceflight (the first and last space flight for the shuttle).
 Israeli–Palestinian conflict: An independent State of Palestine is proclaimed at the Palestinian National Council meeting in Algiers, by a vote of 253–46.
 The very first Fairtrade label, Max Havelaar, is launched by Nico Roozen, Frans van der Hoff and ecumenical development agency Solidaridad in the Netherlands.
 November 16
 Singing Revolution: The Supreme Soviet of the Estonian SSR adopts the Estonian Sovereignty Declaration in which the laws of the Estonian SSR are declared supreme over those of the Soviet Union. The USSR declares it unconstitutional on November 26. It is the first declaration of sovereignty from Moscow of any Soviet or Eastern Bloc entity.
 In the first open election in more than a decade, voters in Pakistan choose populist candidate Benazir Bhutto to be Prime Minister. Elections are held as planned despite head of state Zia-ul-Haq's death earlier in August.
 November 23 – Former Korean president Chun Doo-hwan makes a formal apology for corruption during his presidency, announcing he will go into exile.

December

 December 1
 Carlos Salinas de Gortari takes office as President of Mexico.
 The first World AIDS Day is held.
 December 2
 Benazir Bhutto is sworn in as Prime Minister of Pakistan, becoming the first woman to head the government of an Islam-dominated state.
 A cyclone in Bangladesh leaves 5 million homeless and thousands dead.
 December 6 – The Australian Capital Territory is granted self-government by the Australian Capital Territory (Self-Government) Act 1988.
 December 7 – In Soviet Armenia, the  6.8 Spitak earthquake kills nearly 25,000, injures 31,000 and leaves 400,000 homeless.
 December 12 – The Clapham Junction rail crash in London kills 35 and injures 132.
 December 16 – Perennial U.S. presidential candidate Lyndon LaRouche is convicted of mail fraud.
 December 20 – The United Nations Convention Against Illicit Traffic in Narcotic Drugs and Psychotropic Substances is signed at Vienna.
 December 21 – Pan Am Flight 103 is blown up over Lockerbie, Scotland, killing a total of 270 people. Libya is suspected of involvement.

Date unknown
 Near the end of the year, the first proper and official Internet connection between North America and Europe is made between Princeton, New Jersey, United States, and Stockholm, Sweden.
 Zebra mussels, a species originally native to the lakes of southern Russia and Ukraine, are found in the Great Lakes of North America.

Births

January

 January 1 – Dallas Keuchel, American baseball player 
 January 3 – Jonny Evans, Northern Irish footballer
 January 5 – Azizulhasni Awang, Malaysian track cyclist
 January 7 – Haley Bennett, American actress and singer
 January 8 – Alex Tyus, American-Israeli basketball player
 January 11 – Wang Yimei, Chinese volleyball player
 January 12 
 Claude Giroux, Canadian ice hockey player
 Xiong Jing Nan, Chinese mixed martial artist and current ONE Women's Strawweight World Champion
 January 13 – Artjoms Rudņevs, Latvian footballer
 January 15 – Skrillex, American musician and DJ
 January 16
 Nicklas Bendtner, Danish footballer
 FKA Twigs, English singer-songwriter, record producer, director and dancer
 Li Xiaoxia, Chinese table tennis player
 January 18 – Angelique Kerber, German tennis player
 January 19 – JaVale McGee, American basketball player
 January 21
 Ashton Eaton, American decathlete
 Glaiza de Castro, Filipino actress and singer
 January 25 – Tatiana Golovin, Russian-born French professional tennis player
 January 27 – Liu Wen, Chinese model
 January 29 – Stephanie Gilmore, Australian surfer

February

 February 2 – Zosia Mamet, American actress and musician
 February 3
 Cho Kyuhyun, Korean singer
 Gregory van der Wiel, Dutch footballer
 Kamil Glik, Polish footballer
 February 4 – Carly Patterson, American gymnast
 February 5 – Natalie Geisenberger, German luger
 February 7
 Ai Kago, Japanese singer
 Lee Joon, South Korean idol singer (MBLAQ), dancer, actor and model
 Matthew Stafford, American football player
 February 8 – Zemfira Magomedalieva, Russian boxer
 February 9 
 Lotte Friis, Danish swimmer
 Monika Liu, Lithuanian singer and songwriter
 February 12 – Nicolás Otamendi, Argentinian footballer
 February 13 
 Aston Merrygold, English singer
 Irene Montero, Spanish politician and psychologist
 February 14 – Ángel Di María, Argentine footballer
 February 15 – Rui Patrício, Portuguese footballer
 February 16
 Kat Cammack, American politician
 Diego Capel, Spanish footballer
 Zhang Jike, Chinese table tennis player
 Kim Soo-hyun, South Korean actor
 February 17 
 Natascha Kampusch, Austrian television hostess and kidnapping victim
 Vasiliy Lomachenko, Ukrainian boxer
 February 18 – Changmin, South Korean singer-songwriter and actor
 February 20 
 Rihanna, Barbadian pop singer
 February 21 – Matthias de Zordo, German javelin thrower
 Ki Bo-bae, South Korean archer
 February 22 – Ximena Navarrete, Mexican actress, Miss Universe 2010
 February 24 
 Brittany Bowe, American speed skater
 Efraín Juárez, Mexican footballer
 February 25 – Claudia Faniello, Maltese singer
 February 26 – Kim Yeon-koung, South Korean volleyball player
 February 28 – Markéta Irglová, Czech-Icelandic singer and songwriter
 February 29
 Lena Gercke, German fashion model
 Benedikt Höwedes, German footballer

March

infomation
 March 2 – Matthew Mitcham, Australian diver
 March 4 
 Gal Mekel, Israeli basketball player
 Valentina Shevchenko, Kyrgyz born-Peruvian mixed martial artist
 March 6
 Agnes, Swedish recording artist
 Marina Erakovic, New Zealand tennis player
 Simon Mignolet, Belgian footballer
 Lee Seung-hoon, South Korean speed skater
 March 8 – Laura Unsworth, British field hockey player
 March 10 
 Ego Nwodim, American actress and comedian
 Ivan Rakitić, Croatian and Swiss footballer
 March 11 – Fábio Coentrão, Portuguese footballer
 March 12 
 Sebastian Brendel, German canoeist
 Maryna Litvinchuk, Belarusian canoeist
 March 14 
 Stephen Curry, American basketball player
 Josh Stinson, American Baseball Player
 March 16 
 Jhené Aiko, American singer-songwriter
 Agustín Marchesín, Argentine footballer
 March 17 – Carrie Johnson, British media consultant and activist
 March 19 
 Zhou Lulu, Chinese weightlifter
 Maxim Mikhaylov, Russian volleyball player
 March 20 – Alberto Bueno, Spanish footballer
 March 21 
 Josepmir Ballón, Peruvian footballer
 Gabriela Isler, Venezuelan TV host, fashion model and beauty queen who was crowned Miss Universe 2013.
 March 23 – Jason Kenny, British cyclist
 March 25
 Big Sean, American rapper
 Ryan Lewis, American musician
 March 27
 Holliday Grainger, English actress
 Jessie J, English singer-songwriter
 Brenda Song, American actress
 Atsuto Uchida, Japanese footballer
 March 28 – Lacey Turner, English actress

April

 April 2 – Jesse Plemons, American film and television actor
 April 5 
 Alisha Glass, American volleyball player
 Daniela Luján, Mexican pop singer and actress
 April 6 – Fabrice Muamba, Democratic Congolese born-English football player and coach
 April 7 – Ed Speleers, British actor
 April 8 – Stephanie Cayo, Peruvian actress, singer-songwriter and model
 April 9 – Swara Bhasker, Indian actress
 April 10 – Haley Joel Osment, American actor
 April 12 – Lisa Unruh, German archer
 April 14 – Roberto Bautista Agut, Spanish tennis player
 April 15 – Eliza Doolittle, English singer-songwriter
 April 18
 Anagabriela Espinoza, Mexican model and beauty queen who won Miss International 2009.
 Vanessa Kirby, English actress and model
 Kayleigh McEnany, White House press secretary
 April 19 – Diego Buonanotte, Argentine footballer
 April 21
 Robbie Amell, Canadian-American actor and producer
 Ricky Berens, American Olympic swimmer 
Adriano Moraes, Brazilian mixed martial artist fighter and former ONE Flyweight World Champion
 April 23 
 Victor Anichebe, Nigerian footballer
 Alistair Brownlee, English triathlete
 April 25 – Laura Lepisto, Finnish figure skater
 April 27 
 Lizzo, American singer-songwriter and rapper
 Semyon Varlamov, Russian Ice Hockey player
 April 28 
 Juan Mata, Spanish footballer
 Camila Vallejo, Chilean politician
 April 29 – Jonathan Toews, Canadian ice hockey player
 April 30 – Ana de Armas, Cuban actress

May

 May 1 – Anushka Sharma, Indian actress
 May 4 – Radja Nainggolan, Belgian footballer
 May 6 – Dakota Kai, New Zealand professional wrestler
 May 5 – Adele, British singer-songwriter
 May 7 – Ma Jin, Chinese badminton player
 May 8 – Timm Klose, Swiss footballer
 May 11
 Ace Hood, American rapper
 Blac Chyna, American model and entrepreneur
 Brad Marchand, Canadian ice hockey player
 May 12 – Marcelo Vieira, Brazilian footballer
 May 15 – Endéné Miyem, French basketball player
 May 16 – Behati Prinsloo, Namibian model
 May 17 – Nikki Reed, American actress
 May 18 – Taeyang, South Korean recording artist and model
 May 21 – Park Gyu-ri, South Korean idol singer
 May 23 – Jason Kenny, British track cyclist
 May 25 – Cameron van der Burgh, South African Olympic swimmer
 May 26
 Juan Cuadrado, Colombian footballer
 Dani Samuels, Australian discus thrower
 May 27 
 Geoffrey Couët, French actor and comedian
 Stevin John, American children's entertainer
 May 28 – Cheng Fei, Chinese gymnast
 May 29 – Tobin Heath, American women's soccer player
 May 30 – Amanda Nunes, Brazilian mixed martial artist

June

 June 1 – Javier Hernández, Mexican footballer
 June 2
 Sergio Agüero, Argentine footballer
 Amber Marshall, Canadian actress
 Awkwafina, American actress
 June 4 – Marie Gluesenkamp Perez, American politician
 June 6 – Arianna Errigo, Italian fencer
 June 7
 Michael Cera, Canadian actor, comedian, producer and singer-songwriter
 Ekaterina Makarova, Russian tennis player
 Milan Lucic, Canadian ice hockey player
 June 8 – Lisa Brennauer, German cyclist
 June 9
 Mae Whitman, American actress, voice actress and singer
 Sokratis Papastathopoulos, Greek footballer
 June 11 – Claire Holt, Australian actress
 June 12 
 Eren Derdiyok, Swiss footballer
 Mauricio Isla, Chilean footballer
 June 14 – Kevin McHale, American actor, dancer and singer
 June 16
 Banks, American singer-songwriter
 Thierry Neuville, Belgian rally driver 
 June 17 – Stephanie Rice, Australian swimmer
 June 18 – Josh Dun, American drummer
 June 20 – May J., Japanese singer
 June 22
 Portia Doubleday, American actress
 Dean Furman, South African footballer
 June 23 – Chellsie Memmel, American gymnast
 June 25 – Therese Johaug, Norwegian cross-country skier
 June 27 
 Célia Šašić, German footballer
 Matthew Spiranovic, Australian soccer player
 June 29 – Éver Banega, Argentine footballer

July

 July 1 – Aleksander Lesun, Russian modern pentathlete 
 July 2 – Lee Chung-yong, South Korean footballer
 July 4 – Angelique Boyer, French-Mexican actress and singer
 July 5 – Samir Ujkani, Albanian-Kosovan footballer
 July 10 
 Maja Alm, Danish orienteering and Athletics competitor
 Sarkodie, Ghanaian hip hop artist
 July 13
 Colton Haynes, American actor and model
 Tulisa Contostavlos, British singer-songwriter
 July 14 – Conor McGregor, Irish mixed martial artist
 July 16
 Eric Johannesen, German rower 
 Sergio Busquets, Spanish footballer
 July 20 – Julianne Hough, American ballroom dancer, country music singer and actress
 July 21 – DeAndre Jordan, American basketball player
 July 22 – Noriko Senge, Japanese princess
 July 24 – Han Seung-yeon, South Korean singer and actress
 July 25 
 Sarah Geronimo, Filipina singer and actress
 Paulinho, Brazilian footballer
 July 26 – Francia Raisa, American actress
 July 31 – Charlie Carver, American actor

August

 August 1 
 Max Carver, American actor
 Nemanja Matić, Serbian footballer
 August 2 – Rocío Sánchez Moccia, Argentine field hockey player
 August 5 
 Mizuki Fujii, Japanese badminton player
 Federica Pellegrini, Italian swimmer
 August 8 – Princess Beatrice, British princess
 August 9 – Willian, Brazilian footballer
 August 11 
 Irfan Bachdim, Indonesian footballer 
 Patty Mills, Australian basketball player
 August 12 – Tyson Fury, British boxer
 August 13 – MØ, Danish singer
 August 14 – Kayla Mueller, American human rights activist (d.2015)
 August 18 
 G-Dragon, South Korean rapper, singer-songwriter and fashion icon 
 Katarina Ivanovska, Macedonian model and actress
 August 19 
 Veronica Roth, American novelist and short story writer
 Cristina Scuccia, Italian singer
 August 21
 Kacey Musgraves, American country music artist
 Robert Lewandowski, Polish footballer
 August 23 – Mikhail Aloyan, Russian boxer
 August 24 – Rupert Grint, English actor
 August 25 
 Alexandra Burke, English singer
Giga Chikadze, Georgian mixed martial artist 
 August 28 – Rosie MacLennan, Canadian trampoline gymnast
 August 29 – Bartosz Kurek, Polish volleyball player

September

 September 1 – Simona de Silvestro, Swiss racing driver
 September 2 – Ishant Sharma, Indian cricketer
 September 3 – Jérôme Boateng, German footballer
 September 5
 Felipe Caicedo, Ecuadorian association footballer
 Raquel Pennington, American mixed martial artist
 Nuri Şahin, Turkish footballer
 September 6 – Sargun Mehta, Indian model, comedian, dancer, presenter and actress.
 September 7 – Kevin Love, American basketball player
 September 8 – Roy van den Berg, Dutch track cyclist
 September 10 – Coco Rocha, Canadian fashion model
 September 11 – Lee Yong-dae, South Korean male badminton player
 September 12 – Prachi Desai, Indian film and television actress
 September 13 – Eva-Maria Brem, Austrian alpine skier
 September 14 – Martin Fourcade, French biathlete
 September 15 – Chelsea Kane, American actress and singer
 September 20 
 Sergei Bobrovsky, Russian Ice Hockey player
 Khabib Nurmagomedov, Russian mixed martial artist
 September 21 – Bilawal Bhutto Zardari, Pakistani politician
 September 23 – Juan Martín del Potro, Argentine tennis player
 September 26
 James Blake, English electronic music producer and singer-songwriter
 Kiira Korpi, Finnish figure skater
 Wei Qiuyue, Chinese volleyball player
 September 27 – Alma, French singer-songwriter
 September 28 – Marin Čilić, Croatian tennis player
 September 29 
 Kevin Durant, American basketball player
 Maurício Souza, Brazilian volleyball player and politician
 Alexander Volkanovski, Australian mixed martial artist and boxer

October

 October 1
 Cariba Heine, Australian actress and performer
 Nemanja Matić, Serbian footballer
 October 3
 Alex Dowsett, British racing cyclist
 ASAP Rocky, American rapper and music video director
 Alicia Vikander, Swedish actress
 October 4
 Melissa Benoist, American actress and singer
 Derrick Rose, American basketball player 
 October 5 
 Maja Salvador, Filipino actress
 Sam Warburton, Welsh rugby union player
 October 6 – Jennifer Maia, Brazilian mixed martial artist
 October 7 – Diego Costa, Brazilian born-Spanish footballer
 October 8 – Maddie Hinch, English field hockey player
 October 9 – Amanda Serrano, Puerto Rican boxer, mixed martial artist and professional wrestler
 October 15 – Mesut Özil, German football player
 October 16 – Ikechukwu Ezenwa, Nigerian footballer
 October 18 
 Efe Ambrose, Nigerian footballer
 Sam Quek, British field hockey player
 October 19 
 Irene Escolar, Spanish actress
 Claudia Lösch, Austrian Paralympian and alpine monoskier
 October 20
 Ma Long, Chinese table tennis player
 Candice Swanepoel, South African supermodel
 October 21
 Blanca Suárez, Spanish actress
 Hope Hicks, American public relations consultant, White House Communications Director
 Glen Powell, American actor
 October 22 
 Parineeti Chopra, Indian actress
 Julia Krajewski, German equestrian
 October 23 – Nia Ali, American hurdler
 October 24 – Emilia Fahlin, Swedish cyclist
 October 28 – Camila Brait, Brazilian volleyball player
 October 29 – Dmitry Muserskiy, Russian volleyball player
 October 30 – Tandara Caixeta, Brazilian volleyball player
 October 31 – Sébastien Buemi, Swiss racing driver

November

 November 1 
 Scott Arfield, Scottish footballer
 Masahiro Tanaka, Japanese baseball player
 November 2 – Julia Görges, German tennis player
 November 5 – Virat Kohli, Indian international cricketer
 November 6
 Emma Stone, American actress
 Conchita Wurst, Austrian singer, Eurovision Song Contest 2014 winner
 November 7
 Alexandr Dolgopolov, Ukrainian tennis player
 Tinie Tempah, English rapper
 November 8
Makwan Amirkhani, Iranian-Finnish mixed martial artist
Jessica Lowndes, Canadian actress and singer
 November 12 – Russell Westbrook, American basketball player 
 November 9 – Lio Tipton, American actress and model
 November 15 – B.o.B., American rapper, singer, record producer and conspiracy theorist
 November 16 – Helly Luv, Iranian born-Finnish singer and actress
 November 19 – Patrick Kane, American ice hockey player 
 November 20 – Dušan Tadić, Serbian footballer
 November 22 – Dong Bin, Chinese triple jumper
 November 25 – Nodar Kumaritashvili, Georgian luger (d.2010)
 November 26 
 Hafþór Júlíus Björnsson, Icelandic strongman and actor
 Tamsin Egerton, English actress
 November 29 – Russell Wilson, American football player
 November 30
 Rebecca Rittenhouse American actress
 Phillip Hughes, Australian cricketer (d. 2014)

December

 December 1
 Jelena Blagojević, Serbian volleyball player
 Tyler Joseph, American singer
 Zoë Kravitz, American actress, singer and model
 December 2 – Alfred Enoch, British actor
 December 4 
 Mario Maurer, Thai model and actor
 Justin Meram, American-Iraqi soccer player
 December 5 
 Tina Charles, American basketball player
 Joanna Rowsell, English cyclist
 Miralem Sulejmani, Serbian footballer
 December 6 – Sandra Nurmsalu, Estonian musician
 December 7
 Nathan Adrian, American Olympic swimmer
 Emily Browning, Australian actress
 Cláudia Gadelha, Brazilian mixed martial artist
 December 9 – Kwadwo Asamoah, Ghanaian footballer
 December 10 
 Wilfried Bony, Ivorian footballer
 Jena Hansen, Danish sailor
 Neven Subotić, Serbian footballer
 December 14
 Nicolas Batum, French basketball player
 Vanessa Hudgens, American actress and singer
 December 16
 Mats Hummels, German footballer
 Kaitlyn Lawes, Canadian curler
 Nicco Montaño, American mixed martial artist
 Chibuzor Okonkwo, Nigerian footballer
 Park Seo-joon, South Korean actor and singer
 December 17
 David Rudisha, Kenyan middle-distance runner
 Yann Sommer, Swiss footballer
 Rin Takanashi, Japanese film and television actress
 December 19 – Alexis Sánchez, Chilean footballer
 December 23 – Tatiana Kosheleva, Russian volleyball player
 December 24 – Nikola Mektić, Croatian tennis player
 December 25 
 Dele Adeleye, Nigerian footballer
 Marco Mengoni, Italian singer-songwriter
 December 27 
 Abby Finkenauer, American politician
 Hayley Williams, American singer
 December 28 – Katlyn Chookagian, American mixed martial artist
 December 30 – Henry Hynoski, American Football Player

Date unknown
 Tô Linh Hương, Vietnamese businesswoman
 Tori Black, American adult actress

Deaths

January–February

 January 2 – E. B. Ford, British geneticist (b. 1901)
 January 3
 Gaston Eyskens, Belgian politician, 35th Prime Minister of Belgium (b. 1905)
 Rose Ausländer, German poet (b. 1901)
 January 5 – Pete Maravich, American basketball player (b. 1947)
 January 7 – Trevor Howard, English actor (b. 1913)
 January 11 – Isidor Isaac Rabi, American physicist and academic, Nobel Prize Laureate (b. 1898)
 January 13 – Chiang Ching-kuo, Chinese politician, 3rd President of the Republic of China (b. 1910)
 January 14 – Georgy Malenkov, Soviet politician, 5th Prime Minister of the Soviet Union (b. 1902)
 January 15 – Seán MacBride, Irish Republican Army leader, recipient of the Nobel Peace Prize (b. 1904)
 January 20 – Philippe de Rothschild, French vineyard owner (b. 1902)
 January 25 – Colleen Moore, American actress (b. 1899)
 January 28 – Klaus Fuchs, German-British physicist and spy (b. 1911)
 February 5 – Emeric Pressburger, Hungarian-British film producer (b. 1902)
 February 6 – Carmen Polo, wife of Francisco Franco (b. 1900)
 February 13 – Léon Goossens, British oboist (b. 1897)
 February 14 – Frederick Loewe, Austrian-American composer (b. 1901)
 February 15 – Richard Feynman, American physicist, Nobel Prize laureate (b. 1918)
 February 19
 René Char, French poet (b. 1907)
 André Frédéric Cournand, French-American physician, recipient of the Nobel Prize in Physiology or Medicine (b. 1895)

March–April

 March 3 – Lois Wilson, American actress (b. 1894)
 March 7 – Divine, American singer and actor (b. 1945)
 March 8 – Henryk Szeryng, Polish-born violinist (b. 1918)
 March 9 – Kurt Georg Kiesinger, German politician, 28th Chancellor of the Federal Republic of Germany (West Germany) (b. 1904)
 March 10
 Andy Gibb, English singer, songwriter, performer, and teen idol (b. 1958)
 Phạm Hùng, 3rd Prime Minister of Vietnam (b. 1912)
 March 11
 Rashid Bakr, 10th Prime Minister of Sudan (b. 1930)
 Abdullahi Issa, Somalian politician, 1st Prime Minister of Somalia (b. 1922) 
 March 29 – Dulcie September, South African ANC activist (b. 1935; assassinated).
 March 30 – Edgar Faure, French politician, 69th Prime Minister of France (b. 1908)
 March 31 – Sir William McMahon, Australian politician, 20th Prime Minister of Australia (b. 1908)
 April 12 – Alan Paton, South African author (b. 1903)
 April 17 – Louise Nevelson, Ukrainian-American sculptor (b. 1900)
 April 18 – Pierre Desproges, French humorist (b. 1939)
 April 21
 I. A. L. Diamond, American screenwriter (b. 1920)
 Princess Nadejda Petrovna of Russia (b. 1898)
 April 23 – Michael Ramsey, British Anglican bishop, 100th Archbishop of Canterbury (b. 1904)
 April 26
 Valerie Solanas, American author (b. 1936)
 Valery Legasov, Soviet chemist, chief of the Chernobyl disaster investigation commission (b. 1936)
 April 28 – Fenner Brockway, British politician and anti-war activist (b. 1888)

May–June

 May 3 
 Premendra Mitra, Indian poet, writer and film director (b. 1904)
 Lev Pontryagin, Russian mathematician (b. 1908)
 May 8 – Robert A. Heinlein, American science fiction author (b. 1907)
 May 10 – Shen Congwen, Chinese writer (b. 1902)
 May 11 – Kim Philby, British spy (b. 1912)
 May 13 – Chet Baker, American jazz trumpeter (b. 1929)
 May 14 – Willem Drees, Dutch politician and historian, 30th Prime Minister of the Netherlands (b. 1886)
 May 15 – Greta Nissen, Norwegian-born actress (b. 1905)
 May 21 – Dino Grandi, Italian politician (b. 1895)
 May 27 – Ernst Ruska, German physicist, Nobel Prize laureate (b. 1906)
 May 29 – Siaka Stevens, 3rd Prime Minister of Sierra Leone and 1st President of Sierra Leone (b. 1905)
 May 30 – Ella Raines, American actress (b. 1920)
 June 2 – Raj Kapoor, Indian actor, producer and director (b. 1924)
 June 10 – Louis L'Amour, American writer (b. 1908)
 June 11 – Giuseppe Saragat, Italian politician, 5th President of Italy (b. 1898) 
 June 26 – Hans Urs von Balthasar, Swiss theologian and Catholic priest (b. 1905)
 June 27 – Aparicio Méndez, former President of Uruguay (b. 1904)

July–August

 July 8
 Ray Barbuti, American athlete (b. 1905)
 Ranjit Khanwilkar, Indian cricketer (b. 1960)
 July 12 – Joshua Logan, American stage and film director (b. 1908)
 July 18 – Nico, German rock musician, fashion model, actress and Warhol socialite (b. 1938)
 July 27 
 Brigitte Horney, German actress (b. 1901)
 Frank Zamboni, American inventor (b. 1901)
 August 1
 Florence Eldridge, American actress (b. 1901)
 Georges Wambst, French cyclist (b. 1902)
 August 2 – Raymond Carver, American short-story writer and poet (b. 1938)
 August 6 – Anatoly Levchenko, Soviet cosmonaut (b. 1941)
 August 9 – Ramón Valdés, Mexican actor, comedian, songwriter and entrepreneur (b. 1923)
 August 10 – Arnulfo Arias, Panamanian politician, 3-time President of Panama (b. 1901)
 August 11 – Anne Ramsey, American actress (b. 1929)
 August 12 – Jean-Michel Basquiat, American musician/graffiti painter (b. 1960)
 August 14 – Enzo Ferrari, Italian car maker (b. 1898)
 August 15 - Viktor Tsoi, Russian rock artist and lead singer of the band Kino (b. 1962)
 August 17 – Muhammad Zia-ul-Haq, 6th President of Pakistan (b. 1924)
 August 19 – Sir Frederick Ashton, choreographer (b. 1904)
 August 20 – Lazarus Salii, 3rd President of Palau (b. 1936)
 August 25 – Françoise Dolto, French physician and psychoanalyst (b. 1908)
 August 28 – Paul Grice, British philosopher (b. 1913)
 August 30 – Jack Marshall, 28th Prime Minister of New Zealand (b. 1912)

September–October

 September 1 – Luis Walter Alvarez, American physicist, Nobel Prize laureate (b. 1911)
 September 5 – Gert Fröbe, German actor (b. 1913)
 September 12 – Roger Hargreaves, English author (b. 1935)
 September 18 – Alan Watt, Australian public servant (b. 1901)
 September 28 – Charles Addams, American cartoonist (b. 1912)
 September 30 – Trường Chinh, Vietnamese political leader, 3rd President of Vietnam (b. 1907)
 October 2
 Hamengkubuwono IX, 9th Sultan of Yogyakarta and 2nd Vice President of Indonesia (b. 1912)
 Alec Issigonis, Greek-British engineer (b. 1906)
 October 3 – Franz Josef Strauss, German politician (b. 1915)
 October 9
 Jackie Milburn, English footballer (b. 1924)
 Felix Wankel, German mechanical engineer (b. 1902)
 October 10 – Juan Pujol García ('Garbo'), Spanish Catalan-born double agent (b. 1912)
 October 11 – Bonita Granville, American actress (b. 1923)
 October 16 – Queen Farida of Egypt, consort of King Farouk of Egypt (b. 1921)
 October 19 – Son House, American musician (b. 1902)
 October 22 – Henry Armstrong, American boxer (b. 1912)
 October 29 
 Thomas Cooray, Sri Lankan Roman Catholic archbishop and servant of God (b. 1901)
 Nataša Gollová, Czech actress (b. 1912)
 October 31 – John Houseman, Romanian-American actor and producer (b. 1902)

November–December

 November 4 – Hermann Graf, German fighter ace (b. 1912)
 November 13 – Antal Doráti, Hungarian conductor (b. 1906)
 November 14 – Takeo Miki, Japanese politician, 41st Prime Minister of Japan (b. 1907)
 November 15 – Mona Washbourne, English actress (b. 1903)
 November 19 – Christina Onassis, American shipping magnate (b. 1950)
 November 22
 Luis Barragán, Mexican architect (b. 1902)
 Raymond Dart, Australian anatomist and anthropologist (b. 1893)
 November 24 – Irmgard Seefried, German operatic soprano (b. 1919)
 November 25 
 Alphaeus Philemon Cole, American artist, engraver, etcher and supercentenarian (b. 1876)
 Muhammad bin Abdulaziz Al Saud, Saudi prince (b. 1910)
 November 27
 John Carradine, American actor (b. 1906)
 Takieddin el-Solh, Lebanese politician, 23rd Prime Minister of Lebanon (b. 1908)
 December 6 – Roy Orbison, American rock musician (b. 1936)
 December 10 – Richard S. Castellano, American actor (b. 1933)
 December 21 – Nikolaas Tinbergen, Dutch ornithologist, recipient of the Nobel Prize in Physiology or Medicine (b. 1907)
 December 22 – Chico Mendes, Brazilian environmental activist (murdered) (b. 1944)
 December 27 – Hal Ashby, American film director (b. 1929)

Nobel Prizes

 Physics – Leon M. Lederman, Melvin Schwartz, Jack Steinberger
 Chemistry – Johann Deisenhofer, Robert Huber, Hartmut Michel
 Medicine – Sir James W. Black, Gertrude B. Elion, George H. Hitchings
 Literature – Naguib Mahfouz
 Peace – The United Nations Peace-Keeping Forces
 The Bank of Sweden Prize in Economic Sciences in Memory of Alfred Nobel – Maurice Allais

References

 
Leap years in the Gregorian calendar